Eucomis pallidiflora, the giant pineapple lily, is a bulbous species of flowering plant in the family Asparagaceae, subfamily Scilloideae, native to southern Africa (South Africa, Lesotho and Eswatini). The white to green flowers appear in summer and are arranged in a spike (raceme), topped by a "head" of green leaflike bracts. Some forms reach almost  when in flower. The species is cultivated as an ornamental plant, although it is not hardy in areas where severe frosts occur.

Description
The individual flowers have white, greenish yellow or green tepals and a green ovary. The inflorescence is topped by a head (coma) of up to 30 bracts, sometimes quite small. The plant lacks the purple coloration found other large species of Eucomis, such as Eucomis comosa.

Taxonomy
Eucomis pallidiflora was first described by John Gilbert Baker in 1887. The Latin specific epithet pallidiflora means "pale flowered". It is one of a group of larger tetraploid species of Eucomis, with 2n = 4x = 60.

Two subspecies are recognized by the World Checklist of Selected Plant Families:
 E. pallidiflora subsp. pallidiflora
 E. pallidiflora subsp. pole-evansii (N.E.Br.) Reyneke ex J.C.Manning, formerly treated as a separate species E. pole-evansii

Some sources regard E. pallidiflora subsp. pole-evansii as hardly distinguishable from the typical form.

Distribution and habitat
Eucomis pallidiflora is native to southern Africa – the Cape Provinces, KwaZulu-Natal, the Free State and the Northern Provinces in South Africa, Lesotho and Eswatini.

Cultivation
The plant is not frost-hardy, and requires a winter mulch in those areas subject to freezing temperatures. It has gained the Royal Horticultural Society's Award of Garden Merit. It flowers in summer (August in cultivation in Britain), remaining upright for two months while the seeds ripen. It can be cultivated in containers where severe frosts occur, kept inside and dry in winter.

References 

Scilloideae
Plants described in 1887
Flora of Southern Africa
Taxa named by John Gilbert Baker